Mubasher Lucman is a Pakistani film director, anchorperson, columnist and former caretaker provincial minister in Punjab caretaker ministry in 2007–08. He was made caretaker Minister of Punjab for information technology, communications and works in 2007–08.

Early life and education
Born to movie director-producer of the 50s and 60s Luqman (1922-1994), Mubasher Lucman is a graduate of both Aitchison College Lahore and Government College Lahore.

Singer Aima Baig, with whom he sung a cover of Summer Wine, is his niece.

Showbiz career
In Mubasher's youth, he gained popularity and recognition for his theatre plays. He cited and directed a number of productions. In his early career, his first job was at the Lahore Hilton (present-day Avari) when he had just started in Government College Lahore he had joined as a life guard which included cleaning pool toilet areas and collecting linen. Later, Mubasher Lucman joined an advertising agency as a copy writer. He had worked in the advertising industry of Pakistan for several years and proved his skills through his script for the advertisement of top local and multinational brands of Pakistan including Coca-Cola, Nestle and many others as well. After this, Mubasher Lucman had set up a production company of his own which developed software and content for television channels of Pakistan. Mubasher Lucman had also worked in the corporate field in key positions like WorldCall Group, ARY Digital, NTM (First Private Television Network of Pakistan), PAKTEL and others as well.

Mubasher Lucman then produced, co-wrote and directed the  film Pehla Pehla Pyaar in 2006, starring Resham and Ali Tabish.

Anchor career 
Lucman then started anchoring from the channel Business Plus as a host. During his first experience on the television screen. He then joined the Express News as a host with the programme called Point Blank and then later moved to Dunya News and started to host a programme Khari Baat Lucman Ke Sath. He then joined ARY News hosting Khara Sach. Mubasher then joined BOL Network the newly launched TV channel at the time with his programme Meri Jang for a short while. However the channel was then banned by PEMRA due to the Axact scandal. After a while Mubasher joined Samaa continuing with his hit programme Khara Sach with Mubasher Lucman. Later on, Mubasher left

Criticism

Banned by PEMRA 
Khara Sach was banned by Pakistan Electronic Media Regulatory Authority (PEMRA) due to Lucman's outspoken words.

Books
His books include:
 کھرا سچ : بابا جى کے نام / Kharā sac : Bābā Jī ke nām, Jumhūrī Publications, Lahore, 2014, 208 p. On the alleged corruption of Independent Media Corporation (Pvt.) Ltd and it ties with Indian secret agencies.

Notes

External links 
 
 
 website 

Pakistani television talk show hosts
Pakistani film directors
Pakistani investigative journalists
Pakistani opinion journalists
Pakistani columnists
Aitchison College alumni
Government College University, Lahore alumni
Punjabi people
Living people
1955 births
ARY News newsreaders and journalists
BOL Network people
Provincial ministers of Punjab